(William) Conybeare Bruce  (2 December 1844 – 12 February 1919) was a Welsh Anglican priest, most notably Archdeacon of Monmouth during the late 19th and early 20th centuries.

Bruce was born in St. Nicholas, Vale of Glamorgan, and was educated at University College, Oxford. He was ordained deacon in 1866 and priest in 1867. He served curacies at Itchenstoke, Alverstoke and Brompton; and held livings at St Nicholas (1862-1872) and Newport (1882-1919). He was Archdeacon of Monmouth from 1885 to 1914. He died at Rogiet.

References

People from the Vale of Glamorgan
19th-century Welsh Anglican priests
Alumni of University College, Oxford
Archdeacons of Monmouth
1844 births

1919 deaths